Hemilienardia is a genus of sea snails, marine gastropod mollusks in the family Raphitomidae, the turrids.

Description
This genus is readily distinguishable from Lienardia by the apex. The multispiral protoconch consists of a cone of 3½ smooth rounded whorls. It lacks the characteristic diagonally cancellated sculpture of the other genera in this family. The succeeding adult whorls not only differ in sculpture, but are wound in so divergent a spiral and increase at so disproportionate rate as to project that protoconch in a mucronate point. In the colour of the type the contrast is even more violent, as there the brilliant snow-white apex against the deep rose-red is visible to the naked eye. Another generic feature is an opaque peripheral zone. The deep-seated columella folds, so conspicuous in Lienardia, are here less developed. The species are small, short, stumpy and usually brightly coloured. They frequent the upper zone of coral reefs.

Species
Species within the genus Hemilienardia include:
 Hemilienardia acinonyx Fedosov, Stahlschmidt, Puillandre, Aznar-Cormano & Bouchet, 2017
 Hemilienardia albomagna Wiedrick, 2017
 Hemilienardia albostrigata (Baird, 1873)
 Hemilienardia apiculata (Montrouzier in Souverbie & Montrouzier, 1864) 
 Hemilienardia balteata (Pease, 1860)
 Hemilienardia bicolor Bozzetti, 2018
 Hemilienardia boucheti Wiedrick, 2017
 Hemilienardia calcicincta (Melvill & Standen, 1895)
 Hemilienardia chrysoleuca (J.C. Melvill, 1923)
 Hemilienardia contortula (G. Nevill & H. Nevill, 1875)
 Hemilienardia ecprepes (J.C. Melvill, 1927)
 Hemilienardia elongata Wiedrick, 2017
 Hemilienardia fenestrata (Melvill, 1898)
 Hemilienardia fusiforma Wiedrick, 2017
 Hemilienardia gemmulata Wiedrick, 2017
 Hemilienardia goubini (Hervier, 1896)
 Hemilienardia hersilia Hedley, 1922
 Hemilienardia homochroa Hedley, 1922
 Hemilienardia infulabrunnea Wiedrick, 2017
 Hemilienardia iospira (Hervier, 1896)
 Hemilienardia lynx Fedosov, Stahlschmidt, Puillandre, Aznar-Cormano & Bouchet, 2017
 Hemilienardia malleti (Récluz, 1852)
 Hemilienardia micronesialba Wiedrick, 2017
 Hemilienardia mikesevernsi Wiedrick, 2017
 Hemilienardia minialba Wiedrick, 2017
 Hemilienardia minor (G. Nevill & H. Nevill, 1875)
 Hemilienardia moffitti Wiedrick, 2017
 Hemilienardia multidentata Wiedrick, 2017
 Hemilienardia notopyrrha (Melvill & Standen, 1896)
 Hemilienardia obesa (de Folin, 1879)
 Hemilienardia ocellata (Jousseaume, 1883)
 Hemilienardia pardus Fedosov, Stahlschmidt, Puillandre, Aznar-Cormano & Bouchet, 2017
 Hemilienardia purpurascens (Dunker, 1871)
 Hemilienardia roseorobusta Wiedrick, 2017
 Hemilienardia rubicunda (Gould, 1860)
 Hemilienardia shawnmilleri Wiedrick, 2017
 Hemilienardia subspurca (Hervier, 1896)
 Hemilienardia thyridota (Melvill & Standen, 1896)
 Hemilienardia twilabratcherae Wiedrick, 2017
Species brought into synonymy
 Hemilienardia pinguis (Garrett, A., 1873): synonym of Hemilienardia malleti (Récluz, 1852)

References

 Bouchet P., Kantor Yu.I., Sysoev A. & Puillandre N. (2011) A new operational classification of the Conoidea. Journal of Molluscan Studies 77: 273-308
 Powell, A.W.B. 1966. The molluscan families Speightiidae and Turridae, an evaluation of the valid taxa, both Recent and fossil, with list of characteristic species. Bulletin of the Auckland Institute and Museum. Auckland, New Zealand 5: 1–184, pls 1–23 [
 Boettger O. (1895). Die marinen Mollusken der Philippinen (IV) nach den Sammlungen des Herrn José Florencio Quadra in Manila. IV. Die Pleurotomiden. (Schluss.). Nachrichtsblatt der Deutschen Malakozoologischen Gesellschaft. 27: 41-63
 Wiedrick S.G. (2017). Aberrant geomorphological affinities in four conoidean gastropod genera, Clathurella Carpenter, 1857 (Clathurellidae), Lienardia Jousseaume, 1884 (Clathurellidae), Etrema Hedley, 1918 (Clathurellidae) and Hemilienardia Boettger, 1895 (Raphitomidae), with the descriptionof fourteen new Hemilienardia species from the Indo-Pacific. The Festivus. special issue: 2-45.

External links
 Worldwide Mollusc Species Data Base: Raphitomidae
 

 
Raphitomidae
Gastropod genera